Syed Faruque Rahman (died 28 January 2010) was a coup member involved in toppling the Sheikh Mujib regime in Bangladesh. He was convicted and hanged on 28 January 2010 along with co-conspirators Sultan Shahriar Rashid Khan, A.K.M. Mohiuddin Ahmed, Mohiuddin Ahmed, and Mohammad Bazlul Huda in Dhaka Central Jail, Old Dhaka, for the murder of Sheikh Mujibur Rahman, the founder and first President of Bangladesh. Sayed Faruque Rahman and his close ally Khondaker Abdur Rashid were the chief organisers of the assassination of Sheikh Mujibur Rahman on 15 August 1975. He was 2IC of the 1st Bengal Lancers Regiment of the Bangladesh Army who led a group of junior army officers in-order to overthrew the regime of Sheikh Mujibur Rahman and installed Khondaker Mushtaque Ahmed as President of Bangladesh.

Career 
In 1974, Rahman was placed in charge of recovering weapons in Demra, Munshiganj District, Narayanganj District, and Narsingdi District. He had experienced some things which made him critical of the Bangladesh Awami League government. In 1975 Rahman was a major in the Bangladesh Army. He spoke against Sheikh Mujibur Rahman to his fellow Army officers. He also told them that Sheikh Mujibur Rahman would give Bangladesh to India and that Sheikh Mujibur Rahman would establish a monarchy in Bangladesh.  He and Major Sultan Shahriar Rashid Khan discussed ways of removing Sheikh Mujibur Rahman from power and asked Brigadier General Ziaur Rahman for support. Zia expressed his inability to support them. Zia asked them to do what they think is necessary. They were supported covertly by senior cabinet minister Khondaker Mushtaque Ahmed who was introduced to Rahman by Major Khandaker Abdur Rashid. On 12 August 1975 he discussed the plans with his fellow officers at his wedding anniversary party at the Officers Club, Dhaka. There the officers finalised 15 August 1975 as the day they would launch the coup.

On 14 August 1975, Syed Faruque Rahman met Captain Abdul Aziz Pasha, Captain Bazlul Huda, Major Khandaker Abdur Rashid, Major Shariful Haque Dalim, Major S.H.M.B Noor Chowdhury, Major Sultan Shahriar Rashid Khan, Major Rashed Chowdhury, and other officer met in his office to finalize the plan. According to the plan Rahman commanded the tanks of the Bengal Lancers. Sheikh Mujibur Rahman was killed in his house by Captain Bazlul Huda and Major Noor on 15 August 1975. Immediately after the killing, the officers rendezvoused at the Bangladesh Betar office, and installed Khondakar Mushtaque Ahmed as the new president of Bangladesh. Khondakar Mushtaque called the assassins Surja Santan (the gallant sons) and passed the Indemnity Ordinance which protected the assassins from legal prosecution.

Rahman was promoted to the rank of lieutenant colonel and held a position of power in the new regime until it was overthrown in a counter-coup by pro-Mujib officers led by Maj. Gen. Khaled Mosharraf, who ousted Khondakar Mushtaque. However, 7 November 1975 coup against the Mosharraf by Lt. Col. Abu Taher brought Maj. Gen. Ziaur Rahman to power. Ziaur Rahman was freed by Major Mohiuddin Ahmed. Ziaur Rahman after assuming power appointed the assassins in the diplomatic corps in foreign posts with the exception of Syed Faruque Rahman and Sultan Shahriar Rashid Khan refused to accept the diplomatic posts. In 1979, the Bangladeshi parliament under Ziaur Rahman's Bangladesh Nationalist Party converted the Indemnity ordinance into an official act of parliament. Faruque Rahman was dismissed from Bangladesh Army for his role in Mutinies in Savar Cantonment and Bogra Cantonment and sent abroad. The assassins were removed from government service after they tried to launch a coup against Ziaur Rahman in 1980.

After the assassination of Ziaur Rahman in 1981, Rahman returned to active politics by founding the Freedom Party and running for the presidency against Lt. Gen. Hussain Muhammad Ershad in 1986. He maintained ties with ULFA in Assam, India.

Trial and execution
In 1996, the Awami League under the leadership of Sheikh Mujibur Rahman's daughter, Sheikh Hasina won the general election and became the Prime Minister of Bangladesh. Under her party's majority, the Indemnity Act was repealed and a court case initiated over the killing of Mujib and his family. In August 1996 he was arrested by the Bangladesh Police. In 1998, the Dhaka High Court sentenced Syed Faruque Rahman to death. After the Awami League's defeat in the 2001 general election, the BNP government of Begum Khaleda Zia slowed down the proceedings in the Mujib murder case. In October 2007 he filed an appeal with the Bangladesh Supreme Court. After Sheikh Hasina returned to power in 2009, the court case was restarted. After Rahman's plea for clemency was denied by the Supreme Court of Bangladesh, he was executed along with other plotters on 28 January 2010.

Personal life 
Rahman's son, Syed Tareq Rahman, is a leader of the Freedom Party founded by him.

See also
 Jail Killing Day

References

2010 deaths
Assassination of Sheikh Mujibur Rahman
Bangladeshi lieutenant colonels
Executed military personnel
21st-century executions by Bangladesh
Executed Bangladeshi people
People executed for murder
People executed by Bangladesh by hanging
People convicted of murder by Bangladesh
Bangladeshi people convicted of murder
Bangladesh Freedom Party politicians
Place of birth missing
Year of birth missing
Bangladeshi people of Arab descent